Aristolochic acids are a family of carcinogenic, mutagenic, and nephrotoxic phytochemicals commonly found in the flowering plant family Aristolochiaceae (birthworts). Aristolochic acid (AA) I is the most abundant one. The family Aristolochiaceae includes the genera Aristolochia and Asarum (wild ginger), which are commonly used in Chinese herbal medicine. Although these compounds are widely associated with kidney problems, liver and urothelial cancers, the use of AA-containing plants for medicinal purposes has a long history. The FDA has issued warnings regarding consumption of AA-containing supplements.

History

Early medical uses
Birthwort plants, and the aristolochic acids they contain, were quite common in ancient Greek and Roman medical texts, well-established as an herb there by the fifth century BC. Birthworts appeared in Ayurvedic texts by 400 AD, and in Chinese texts later in the fifth century. In these ancient times, it was used to treat kidney and urinary problems, as well as gout, snakebites, and a variety of other ailments. It was also considered to be an effective contraceptive. In many of these cases, birthworts were just some of the many ingredients used to create ointments or salves. In the early first century, in Roman texts, aristolochic acids are first mentioned as a component of frequently ingested medicines to treat things such as asthma, hiccups, spasms, pains, and expulsion of afterbirth.

Discovery of toxicity

Kidney damage
Aristolochic acid poisoning was first diagnosed at a clinic in Brussels, Belgium, when cases of nephritis leading to rapid kidney failure were seen in a group of women who had all taken the same weight-loss supplement, Aristolochia fangchi, which contained aristolochic acid.  This nephritis was termed “Chinese herbs nephropathy” (CHN) due to the origin of the weight-loss supplement.  A similar condition previously known as Balkan endemic nephropathy (BEN), first characterized in the 1950s in southeastern Europe, was later discovered to be also the result of aristolochic acid (AA) consumption. BEN is more slowly progressive than the nephritis that is seen in CHN, but is likely caused by low-level AA exposure, possibly from contamination of wheat flour seeds by a plant of the birthwort family, Aristolochia clematitis.  CHN and BEN fall under the umbrella of what is now known as aristolochic acid nephropathy, the prevalent symptom of AA poisoning.

Liver cancer
A study reported in the Science Translational Medicine journal in October 2017 reported high incidences of liver cancer in Asia, particularly Taiwan, which bore the "well-defined mutational signature" of aristolochic acids.  The same link was found in Vietnam and other South-east Asian countries.  This was compared with much lower rates found in Europe and North America.

Biosynthesis
The herbal drug known as aristolochic acid contains a mixture of numerous structurally related nitrophenanthrene carboxylic acids generally consisting of two major compounds: aristolochic acid I (AA-I) and aristolochic acid II (AA-II). The biosynthesis of these compounds has been of considerable interest due in large part to the inclusion of both an aryl carboxylic acid and an aryl nitro functionality (uncommon in natural products) within their structures, which suggested an apparent biogenetic relationship to the well-known aporphine alkaloids. Furthermore, this association thereby suggested a biosynthetic relationship with norlaudanosoline (tetrahydropapaveroline) or related benzylisoquinoline precursors, which in turn are derived from tyrosine (2).  Feeding studies (Aristolochia sipho) independently using uniquely 14C-labeled compounds [3-14C]-tyrosine, [2-14C]-dopamine and [2-14C]-dihydroxyphenylalanine resulted in the isolation of [14C]-AA-I in each case, which illustrated that the aporphine alkaloid stephanine (11) could be a precursor of AA-I since tyrosine, L-DOPA (3) and dopamine (4) were known precursors of norlaudanosoline: tyrosine (2) is metabolized to L-DOPA (3) which is  converted into dopamine (4) which is metabolized to 3,4-dihydroxyphenylacetaldehyde (DOPAL); cyclization of these two compounds results in the formation of norlaudanosoline via a Pictet-Spengler like condensation catalyzed by norlaudanosoline synthetase.   

Subsequent feeding studies that used (±)‑[4‑14C]-norlaudanosoline also resulted in the formation of 14C‑labeled-AAI, further suggesting that norlaudanosoline and stephanine (11) could have a possible intermediacy in the biosynthesis of AA-I. Degradation studies of the isolated 14C-labeled AA-I demonstrated that the carbon atom at ring position C4 of the benzyltetrahydroisoquinoline norlaudanosoline was incorporated exclusively in the carboxylic acid moiety of AAI. When this study was repeated but using [4‑14C]-tetrahydropapaverine no labeled AAI was isolated; this observation established that a phenol oxidative reaction was required for the biosynthesis of AA-I from norlaudanosoline, further supporting the intermediacy of aporphine intermediates. The results of a feeding experiment (A. sipho) with (±)‑[3‑14C, 15N]-tyrosine followed by degradation of the isolated doubly labeled AA-I provided evidence that the nitro group of AA-I originates from the amino group of tyrosine. 

Confirmation of the involvement of aporphine intermediates in the biogenetic route from norlaudanosoline to AA-I was obtained some two decades later through a series of feeding studies (Aristolochia bracteata) using several labeled hypothetical benzyltetrahydroisoquinoline and aporphine precursors. Feeding experiments with (±)‑[5’,8‑3H2; 6-methoxy‑14C]-nororientaline resulted in the isolation of the doubly labeled AA-I. Cleavage of the methylenedioxy group with trapping of the resulting 14C‑labeled formaldehyde confirmed that this functionality was formed from the o‑methoxyphenol segment of the tetrahydroisoquinoline ring of nororientaline. (±)‑[5’,8‑3H2]‑Orientaline was also incorporated into AA-I. These observations implied that the aporphine prestephanine (10)  would be an obligatory intermediate in the biosynthesis, which would involve the intermediacy of the proaporphines orientalinone (8) and orientalinol (9) via the known intramolecular dienone-dienol-phenol sequence for the transformation of benzyltetrahydroisoquinolines to aporphines. A potential role for CYP80G2, a cytochrome P450 that has been demonstrated to catalyze the intramolecular C-C phenol coupling of several benzyltetrahydroisoquinolines, in this orientaline (7) to prestephanine (10) transformation has been suggested. (±)‑[aryl‑3H]‑Prestephanine was incorporated into AA-I confirming its intermediacy in the biosynthesis; and also (±)‑[aryl‑3H]‑stephanine was incorporated into AA-I.  This final transformation, that is stephanine (11) to AA-I (12), involves an uncommon oxidative cleavage of the B ring of the aporphine structure to give a nitro substituted phenanthrene carboxylic acid. Hence, taken together these experiments support the sequence outlined for the biosynthesis of aristolochic acid I from norlaudanosoline.

Symptoms and diagnosis
Exposure to aristolochic acid is associated with a high incidence of uroepithelial tumorigenesis, and is linked to urothelial cancer. Since aristolochic acid is a mutagen, it does damage over time. Patients are often first diagnosed with aristolochic acid nephropathy (AAN), which is a rapidly progressive nephropathy and puts them at risk for renal failure and urothelial cancer. However, urothelial cancer is only observed long after consumption.  One study estimated, on average, detectable cancer develops ten years from the start of daily aristolochic acid consumption.

A patient thought to have AAN can be confirmed through phytochemical analysis of plant products consumed and detection of aristolactam DNA adducts in the renal cells. (Aristolochic acid is metabolised into aristolactam.) Additionally, mutated proteins in renal cancers as a result of transversion of A:T pairings to T:A are characteristically seen in aristolochic acid-induced mutations.  In some cases, early detection resulting in cessation of aristolochia-product consumption can lead to reverse of the kidney damage.

Pharmacology

Absorption, distribution, metabolism, and excretion

Once orally ingested, aristolochic acid I is absorbed through the gastrointestinal tract into the blood stream. It is distributed throughout the body via the blood stream.

Aristolochic acids are metabolized by oxidation and reduction pathways, or phase I metabolism. Reduction of aristolochic acid I produces aristolactam I which has been observed in the urine. Further processing of aristolactam I by O-demethylation results in aristolactam Ia, the primary metabolite. Additionally, nitroreduction results in an N-acylnitrenium ion, which can form DNA-base adducts, thus giving aristolochic acid I its mutagenic properties.

Aristolactam I adducts that are bound to DNA are extremely stable; they have been detected in patient biopsy samples taken 20 years after exposure to plants containing aristolochic acid.

Excretion of aristolochic acids and their metabolites is through the urine.

Mechanism of action
The exact mechanism of action of aristolochic acid is not known, especially in regards to nephropathy.  The carcinogenic effects of aristolochic acids are thought to be a result of mutation of the tumor suppressor gene TP53, which seems to be unique to aristolochic acid-associated carcinogenesis. Nephropathy caused by aristolochic acid consumption is not mechanistically understood, but DNA adducts characteristic of aristolochic acid-induced mutations are found in the kidneys of AAN patients, indicating these might play a role.

Regulation
In April 2001, the Food and Drug Administration issued a consumer health alert warning against consuming botanical products, sold as "traditional medicines" or as ingredients in dietary supplements, containing aristolochic acid. The agency warned that consumption of aristolochic acid-containing products was associated with "permanent kidney damage, sometimes resulting in kidney failure that has required kidney dialysis or kidney transplantation. In addition, some patients have developed certain types of cancers, most often occurring in the urinary tract."

In August 2013, two studies identified an aristolochic acid mutational signature in upper urinary tract cancer patients from Taiwan.  The carcinogenic effect is the most potent found thus far, exceeding the amount of mutations in smoking-induced lung cancer and UV-exposed melanoma. Exposure to aristolochic acid may also cause certain types of liver cancer.

See also
List of herbs with known adverse effects
 Piperolactam A
Stephania tetrandra

References

Further reading

External links

 Complete list of warnings from the US Food and Drug Administration
 FDA Concerned About Botanical Products, Including Dietary Supplements, Containing Aristolochic Acid May 2000.
 Plants Containing Aristolochic Acid
 Herbal medicines causing kidney failure, bladder cancer in India, Times of India, Mar 19, 2013

IARC Group 1 carcinogens
Nitro compounds
Phenol ethers
Benzoic acids
Plant toxins
Phenanthrenes
Benzodioxoles